The northern gracile opossum (Gracilinanus marica) is a species of opossum in the family Didelphidae. It is found in Colombia and Venezuela. Its natural habitat is subtropical or tropical moist lowland forests.

References

Opossums
Mammals of Colombia
Mammals of Venezuela
Marsupials of South America
Mammals described in 1898
Taxa named by Oldfield Thomas
Taxonomy articles created by Polbot